The NORCECA Men's Volleyball Championship is the official competition for senior men's national volleyball teams of North America, Central America and the Caribbean, organized by the North, Central America and Caribbean Volleyball Confederation (NORCECA). Since its introduction in 1969 the tournaments have been awarded every two years. The competition has been dominated by Cuba and United States, which won together 25 of the 27 editions of the tournament.

History

Medals Summary

MVP by edition
1969 – 1999 – Unknown
2001 –  Ángel Dennis
2003 –  Clay Stanley
2005 –  Raidel Poey
2007 –  Lloy Ball
2009 –  Wilfredo León
2011 –  Keibel Gutiérrez
2013 –  Matt Anderson
2015 –  Nicholas Hoag
2017 –  Micah Christenson
2019 –  Miguel Ángel López
2021 –  Arturo Iglesias

See also

NORCECA Women's Volleyball Championship
Men's Junior NORCECA Volleyball Championship
Boys' Youth NORCECA Volleyball Championship
Volleyball at the Pan American Games
Men's Pan-American Volleyball Cup
Volleyball at the Central American and Caribbean Games

References

External links
NORCECA

 
 
V
Volleyball competitions in North America
Volleyball in Central America
Volleyball in the Caribbean
International volleyball competitions
International men's volleyball competitions
North American international sports competitions
Biennial sporting events